The Latvian Orthodox Autonomous Church, or All Holy Orthodox Church of Latvia, is a True Orthodox church in Latvia which is part of the Russian Orthodox Autonomous Church.

Since 2011, the LOAC has declared itself a part of the Patriarchate of Constantinople, commemorating the Ecumenical Patriarch of Constantinople in its liturgies.

The current primate of the LAOC is Archbishop Victor of Daugavpils and Latvia.

History 
Since 1994, this church had asked the Latvian State to be recognized as an Eastern Orthodox religious association, because the Latvian law only allows for one institution to be registered for each religious denomination and that the Latvian Orthodox Church is already registered.

As of March 2018, the LOAC had not been recognized by Latvia as an Orthodox religious organization. However, in October 2019, the LAOC managed to be officially registered along with the Latvian Orthodox Church, because the LAOC claimed it (the LAOC) was already registered in 1936.

The church had around 14 parishes as of 2006. The church had around 220 believers in Latvia as of 2015.

References 

True Orthodox denominations
Eastern Orthodoxy in Latvia